Alberto Ohaco (1889-1950) was an Argentine footballer who played for Racing Club de Avellaneda. He won seven league titles and is considered to have been one of the greatest Argentine footballers of all time.

Ohaco whose father was one of the founding members of Racing Club became one of the club's greatest players. He is still the most winning player in Racing Club' history having won a total of 20 titles with the club, including seven Primera División consecutive championships between 1913 and 1919. He was also four times top scorer in the Argentine league between 1912 and 1915. He scored a total of 244 goals for the club making him the highest scoring player in the history of the institution.

Ohaco played for the Argentina national team between 1912 and 1918, playing in the first two editions of the Copa América in 1916 and 1917

In Primera División, Ohaco scored 138 goals for Racing between 1911 and 1921.

Titles

Club
Racing Club
 Primera División (8): 1913, 1914, 1915, 1916, 1917, 1918, 1919, 1921
 Copa Ibarguren (5): 1913, 1914, 1916, 1917, 1918
 Copa de Honor MCBA (4): 1912, 1913, 1915, 1917 
 Copa de Honor Cousenier (1): 1913
 Copa Aldao (2): 1917, 1918

References

External links

 

1880s births
1950 deaths
Sportspeople from Avellaneda
Argentine footballers
Argentina international footballers
Association football forwards
Argentine Primera División players
Racing Club de Avellaneda footballers
Río de la Plata